Alexey Panfili (born 5 January 1974 in Bishkek, Kirghiz SSR) is a Russian-Kazakhstani former water polo player. At the 2012 Summer Olympics, he competed for the Kazakhstan men's national water polo team in the men's event. He is 6 ft 6 inches tall.

See also
 List of World Aquatics Championships medalists in water polo

References

External links
 

1974 births
Living people
Russian male water polo players
Kazakhstani male water polo players
Olympic water polo players of Russia
Olympic water polo players of Kazakhstan
Water polo players at the 1996 Summer Olympics
Water polo players at the 2012 Summer Olympics
Sportspeople from Chișinău
Asian Games medalists in water polo
Water polo players at the 2010 Asian Games
Water polo players at the 2014 Asian Games
Asian Games gold medalists for Kazakhstan
Medalists at the 2010 Asian Games
Medalists at the 2014 Asian Games